Ina Balin (née Rosenberg; November 12, 1937 – June 20, 1990) was an American stage, film, and television actress. She is best known for her role in the film From the Terrace (1960), for which she received two Golden Globe Award nominations and won one for Most Promising Newcomer – Female.

Early years
Balin was born in Brooklyn, New York, to Jewish parents. Her father, Sam Rosenberg, was a dancer, singer and comedian who worked the Borscht Belt. He later quit show business to join his family's furrier business. Her mother was a Hungarian-born professional dancer who escaped a troubled family life by marrying at age 15. Sam Rosenberg was her third husband by age 21. They too divorced when Ina and her brother, Richard Balin, were still quite young. The siblings were placed in boarding schools until their mother married a fourth time, then to shoe magnate Harold Balin, who later adopted Ina and Richard.

Balin graduated from high school at age 15 after having spent five years at a boarding school in Pennsylvania.

Career

Television
Balin first appeared on television on The Perry Como Show. She guest-starred on dozens of television shows, including Wonder Woman; Adventures in Paradise; Bonanza; The Lieutenant; The Dick Van Dyke Show; The Six Million Dollar Man; Voyage to the Bottom of the Sea; Battlestar Galactica; Get Smart; It Takes a Thief; Ironside; Twelve O'Clock High; The Loner; Quincy, M.E.; The Streets of San Francisco;  Magnum, P.I.; and Mannix.

She appeared with Joseph Cotten, Fernando Lamas and Dean Jagger in the 1969 made-for-television movie The Lonely Profession.

Stage
Balin did summer stock, which led to roles on Broadway. She first starred on Broadway in Compulsion, portraying Ruth. In 1959, she had the role of Alice Black in the comedy A Majority of One.

Film
In 1959, Balin landed her first film role in The Black Orchid. She was Paul Newman's love interest in the 1960 screen adaptation of From the Terrace. In 1961, she appeared as Pilar Graile in The Comancheros with John Wayne and Stuart Whitman. Co-starring with Jerry Lewis in the 1964 hit comedy The Patsy, Balin also had a secondary part in 1965's The Greatest Story Ever Told. She also co-starred with Elvis Presley in his 1969 film Charro! She co-starred in the 1971 film The Projectionist. She also co-starred in the 1982 comedy The Comeback Trail, and she appeared in The Young Doctors, the 1961 hospital drama with Ben Gazzara, and Fredric March.

Awards
In 1959, Balin won the Theatre World Award for her performance in the Broadway comedy A Majority of One. Then in 1961, in recognition of her critically acclaimed performance in From the Terrace, she won the New Star of the Year-Actress Golden Globe Award and was also nominated for the Golden Globe Award for Best Supporting Actress — Motion Picture.

Humanitarian activities
In 1966, Balin toured Vietnam with the USO on the first of many trips to the war-torn region. In 1975, she aided in the evacuation of orphans during the fall of Saigon. Eventually, she adopted three of these orphaned children. In 1980, she played herself in a made-for-television movie based on her experiences, The Children of An Lac.

Death
Balin, a former cigarette smoker, died on June 20, 1990 at Yale–New Haven Hospital in New Haven, Connecticut, aged 52, from complications of chronic lung disease, including pulmonary hypertension (high blood pressure of the lungs). She had been at the hospital seeking a lung transplant.

A single mother, she was survived by her father, Sam Rosenberg; her three adopted children: Nguyet Baty, Ba-Nhi Mai, and Kim Thuy; a brother, Richard Balin; and two grandchildren. Ba-Nhi Mai and Kim Thuy were raised by Hollywood talent agent Ted Ashley and his wife Page (née Cuddy).

Filmography
 

 The Black Orchid (1958) – Mary Valente
 From the Terrace (1960) – Natalie Benzinger
 The Young Doctors (1961) – Cathy Hunt
 The Comancheros (1961) – Pilar Graile
 The Patsy (1964) – Ellen Betz
 Act of Reprisal (1964) – Eleni
 The Greatest Story Ever Told  (1965) – Martha of Bethany
 Bonanza - Evil on Her Shoulder (1965) - Sarah
 Run Like a Thief (1967) – Mona Shannon
 Charro! (1969) – Tracey Winters
 The Lonely Profession (1969, TV movie) – Karen Menardos
 Desperate Mission (1969) – Otilia Ruiz
 The Projectionist (1971) – The Girl
 Call to Danger (1973, TV movie) – Marla Hayes
 The Don Is Dead (1973) – Nella
 Panic on the 5:22 (1974, TV movie) – Countess Hedy Maria Tovarese
 The Immigrants (1978, TV movie) – Maria Cassala
 Galyon (1980) – Janet Davis
 The Children of An Lac (1980, TV movie) – Ina Balin
 The Comeback Trail (1982) – Julie Thomas
 Vasectomy: A Delicate Matter (1986) – Regine
 That's Adequate (1989) – Sister Mary Enquirer (final film role)

References

External links
 
 
 

American film actresses
American humanitarians
Women humanitarians
American stage actresses
American television actresses
Actresses from New York City
Jewish American actresses
1937 births
1990 deaths
20th-century American actresses
Deaths from hypertension
People from Brooklyn
Activists from New York (state)
New Star of the Year (Actress) Golden Globe winners
20th-century American Jews